Cheap Trick is the debut studio album by the American rock band Cheap Trick, released in 1977. It was released under Epic Records and produced by Jack Douglas, a frequent collaborator of the band. The album did not reach the Billboard 200 chart but did "bubble under" at number 207 for one week in April 1977.

Overview 
Most of the songs have a more raw sound akin to hard rock bands of the period compared to the group's later more polished power pop style, and the song lyrics deal with more extreme subject matter than later albums. For instance, "The Ballad of TV Violence (I'm Not the Only Boy)" is about serial killer Richard Speck, "Daddy Should Have Stayed in High School" is about an ephebophile, and "Oh, Candy" is about a photographer friend of the band, Marshall Mintz, who committed suicide.

Critical reception 

The album was generally well-received by critics with favorable comparisons to the Beatles and the Who, with critics likening Robin Zander's vocals to John Lennon's. Charles M. Young, writing for Rolling Stone, said the album had a "heavy emphasis on basics with a strain of demented violence" and that the lyrics "run the gamut of lust, confusion and misogyny, growing out of rejection and antiauthoritarian sentiments about school—all with an element of wit." Ira Robbins of Trouser Press noted the album's "wall-of-guitar sound" and said the band was "sarcastic, smart, nasty, powerful, tight, casual, and destined for something great."

Track listing 
All songs written by Rick Nielsen except where noted.

Note: The original vinyl record had "Side A" printed on the label on one side and "Side 1" printed on the other, a humorous touch reflecting the band's conviction that they didn't have any "B material". The placement of the track listing on the jacket seemed to indicate "Hot Love" was the first track on the album. When the album was released on CD in the mid-1980s, it followed the same sequence. However, when the album was re-issued in 1998, the band's preferred sequence was used, placing "Side 1" before "Side A" and included five bonus tracks:

Personnel
Cheap Trick
 Robin Zander – lead vocals, rhythm guitar
 Rick Nielsen – lead guitar, mandocello, vocals
 Tom Petersson – bass guitar, vocals
 Bun E. Carlos – drums

Technical
 Jack Douglas – producer
 Jay Messina – engineer
 Sam Ginsberg – assistant engineer
 Paula Scher – cover design
 Jim Houghton – photography

Charts

2017 reissue

Cover versions
In the documentary End of the Century: The Story of the Ramones, Johnny Ramone stated that the guitar riff in "The KKK Took My Baby Away" was inspired by the riff in "He's a Whore".

Big Black released a cover of "He's a Whore" as a single with a picture sleeve in the style of Cheap Trick's album cover. The back of the sleeve was a similar take on the German band Kraftwerk and their song, "The Model".  Big Black's version was included as a bonus track on the CD release of their second album, Songs About Fucking.

The Methadones covered "He's a Whore" on 21st Century Power Pop Riot, an album of covers released in 2006. Concrete Blonde covered "Mandocello" on Still in Hollywood.

References

Notes 
 

1977 debut albums
Albums produced by Jack Douglas (record producer)
Albums recorded at Record Plant (New York City)
Cheap Trick albums
Epic Records albums
Legacy Recordings albums